Extraordinary Exhibition  is a 1968 Soviet black-and-white drama-Comedy film directed by Eldar Shengelaya.

Plot
To support his family, the sculptor undertook the production of gravestones. Then he was drawn in, he got married, and carried away by everyday life, the betrayed his dreams. He realised this one day, when he was in a cemetery, surrounded by his own works. This explains the title: the only exhibition he had is made of tomb stones.

Cast
 Guram Lortkipanidze as Aguli
 Valentina Telichkina as Glafira Ogurtsova
 Vasili Chkhaidze as Pipinia
 Dodo Abashidze as Shavlegi
 Salome Kancheli as Widow
 Julieta Vashakmadze as Tina
 Victor Deisadze as Bonaventuri
 Akaki Doborjginidze as Dimitri
 Aleksandre Kelbalkiani as Pestvianidze 
 Nikoloz Miqashavidze as Khurtsidze
 Jaba Tsuladze as Akimi
 Shota Gabelaia as Jincharadze

References

External links

1968 films
1960s Russian-language films
1968 comedy-drama films
Soviet comedy-drama films
Soviet black-and-white films
Georgian-language films
Kartuli Pilmi films
Films directed by Eldar Shengelaia
Soviet-era films from Georgia (country)
Comedy-drama films from Georgia (country)
Black-and-white films from Georgia (country)